Greene County is a county located in the U.S. state of North Carolina. As of the 2020 census, the population was 20,451. Its county seat is Snow Hill.

History
Greene County, being a part of land grant by King Charles II of England in 1663, was first settled around 1710 by immigrants from Maryland, Virginia, and parts of North Carolina. The original inhabitants of the area, the Tuscarora Indians, fought with these immigrants and on March 20–23, 1713, a fighting force of South Carolinians and Yamasee Indians, under Colonel Murice Moore, defeated the Tuscarora, under the leadership of Chief Hancock. This was the final major battle of the Tuscarora War at Fort Neoheroka near current day Snow Hill.

In 1758, the area now recognized as Greene and Lenoir Counties was separated from Johnston and named Dobbs for the Royal Governor. The county was formed in 1791 from the northern part of Dobbs County. It was originally named Glasgow County, for James Glasgow, North Carolina Secretary of State from 1777 to 1798. In 1799, Glasgow's involvement in military land grant frauds forced him to resign and leave the state. Glasgow County was then renamed Greene County in honor of Nathanael Greene, one of General Washington's right-hand men.

The county seat, Snow Hill, is the largest town and major commercial center in the county. The town draws its name from the historic white sandy banks of nearby Contentnea Creek.

Former Greene County 
Present-day Greene County is the second county of that name in North Carolina. The first (also named for Nathanael Greene) is now Greene County, Tennessee. It was established in 1783, in what was then the western part of the state. That area was ceded to the federal government and became part of the Southwest Territory (1790–1796) and the State of Tennessee (after 1796).

Geography

Pitt–Greenville Airport  is the closest airport and it is located in Pitt County.

State and local protected areas
 Contentnea Creek Hunting Preserve
 Oak Hill Preserve

Major water bodies
 Contentnea Creek
 Middle Swamp
 Nahunta Swamp
 Reedy Branch (Trent River tributary)
 Sandy Run
 Turnage Millpond
 Wheat Swamp (Contentnea Creek tributary)

Adjacent counties
 Pitt County - east-northeast
 Wilson County - northwest
 Lenoir County - south
 Wayne County - west

Major highways

Demographics

2020 census

As of the 2020 United States census, there were 20,451 people, 7,164 households, and 4,750 families residing in the county.

2000 census
As of the census of 2000, there were 18,975 people, 6,696 households, and 4,955 families residing in the county.  The population density was 72 people per square mile (28/km2).  There were 7,368 housing units at an average density of 28 per square mile (11/km2).  The racial makeup of the county was 51.83% White, 41.21% Black or African American, 0.30% Native American, 0.09% Asian, 0.01% Pacific Islander, 5.75% from other races, and 0.80% from two or more races.  7.96% of the population were Hispanic or Latino of any race.

There were 6,696 households, out of which 34.30% had children under the age of 18 living with them, 52.10% were married couples living together, 17.30% had a female householder with no husband present, and 26.00% were non-families. 22.60% of all households were made up of individuals, and 10.00% had someone living alone who was 65 years of age or older.  The average household size was 2.65 and the average family size was 3.09.

In the county, the population was spread out, with 25.30% under the age of 18, 9.40% from 18 to 24, 30.90% from 25 to 44, 22.30% from 45 to 64, and 12.10% who were 65 years of age or older.  The median age was 36 years. For every 100 females there were 105.70 males.  For every 100 females age 18 and over, there were 103.90 males.

The median income for a household in the county was $32,074, and the median income for a family was $36,419. Males had a median income of $27,048 versus $21,351 for females. The per capita income for the county was $15,452.  About 16.00% of families and 20.20% of the population were below the poverty line, including 28.30% of those under age 18 and 20.50% of those age 65 or over.

Government and politics
Prior to the 1965 Voting Rights Act, Greene County was an overwhelmingly Democratic “Solid South” bastion. Between 1932 and 1956, every Democratic nominee reached 93.5 percent of the county's vote, and up to 1960 Herbert Hoover in the religiously polarized 1928 election had been the only post-disfranchisement Republican to pass 22 percent of the county's vote. Unlike the Black Belts of the Deep South, Greene County completely resisted the Dixiecrat movement of 1948 to be only 0.07 percent shy of Texas’ Duval County as Harry Truman’s strongest in the country, and in 1952 it was indeed Adlai Stevenson II’s strongest county in his landslide loss to Dwight D. Eisenhower, besides being his strongest behind Georgia’s Baker County in 1956. However, opposition to the voting and civil rights legislation of the Lyndon Johnson administration turned the county over to George Wallace in the 1968 presidential election, and Richard Nixon became the first Republican winner since Benjamin Harrison in 1888 with 75 percent of the vote in 1972. Since then, Greene County has gradually become Republican-leaning: the last Democratic Presidential candidate to carry the county was Bill Clinton in 1992, although no Democrat except McGovern and Humphrey has fallen under 40 percent.

Despite having voted Republican in six consecutive presidential elections, Greene County is represented by Democratic Senator Toby Flinch in the 4th district of the North Carolina State Senate.

Greene County is a member of the regional Eastern Carolina Council of Governments.

Economy 
Green County is classified by the state of North Carolina as economically distressed. The average income of a resident is approximately $36,700 per year.

Education
Schools is Greene County are administered by the Greene County Public School system. The five schools include Greene Central High School, Greene Early College High School, Greene County Middle School, Snow Hill Primary School and West Greene Elementary School. Higher education is provided through nearby East Carolina University or community colleges located in Goldsboro, Greenville and Kinston. One private school, Mt. Calvary Christian Academy, is also located in the county.

Communities

Towns
 Hookerton
 Snow Hill (county seat and largest town)
 Walstonburg

Census-designated place
 Maury

Unincorporated community
 Jason

Townships

 Bull Head
 Carrs
 Hookerton
 Jason
 Olds
 Ormondsville
 Shine
 Snow Hill
 Speights Bridge

See also
 List of counties in North Carolina
 National Register of Historic Places listings in Greene County, North Carolina
 List of Highway Historical Markers in Greene County, North Carolina
 List of future Interstate Highways

References

External links

 
 
 Greene County, NC Chamber of Commerce

 
Greenville, North Carolina metropolitan area
1791 establishments in North Carolina
Populated places established in 1791
Majority-minority counties in North Carolina